Alessandro Marchi (born 7 December 1989) is an Italian footballer.

Biography

Rimini
Born in Urbino, Marche, Marchi started his professional career with Emilia–Romagna side Rimini. On 17 March 2009, he made his Serie B debut, substituted Emilio Docente in the 71st minute. The match Rimini 1–1 draw with Livorno. He follow the team relegated to 2009–10 Lega Pro Prima Divisione but the club went bankrupt in July 2010.

Piacenza
In July 2010, Marchi was signed by Piacenza. After a few substitute appearances, he became the first choice after Armando Madonna, the coach changed the tactic from 4231/451 to 433 formation, as a right midfielder, ahead Luca Tremolada. Eventually he made 27 starts. He followed the team relegated to 2011–12 Lega Pro Prima Divisione.

Bologna 
On 24 January 2012 Marchi was sold to Bologna F.C. 1909 in a co-ownership deal for €65,000 in a 4-year contract, worth €86,717 in net a season. He returned to Piacenza for the rest of season on loan. in June 2012 Bologna acquired Marchi for free.

On 31 August 2012 Marchi was signed by Frosinone.

In July 2013 the Bologna F.C. announced that it had reached an agreement with the Catanzaro for the transfer on loan of Marchi with the right of redemption.

Cremonese
On 17 July 2014 Marchi was signed by Cremonese for free. On 3 July 2015 Marchi was released in a mutual consent.

Pavia
In summer 2015 Marchi was signed by Pavia. He made his debut on 15 July in a friendly match.

Livorno
After the bankruptcy of Pavia, Marchi joined Livorno.

Rieti
On 17 January 2019, he signed a two-year contract with Rieti.

References

External links
 Piacenza Profile 
 Football.it Profile 
 
 La Gazzetta dello Sport Profile 
 

Italian footballers
Serie B players
Serie C players
Rimini F.C. 1912 players
Piacenza Calcio 1919 players
Frosinone Calcio players
U.S. Catanzaro 1929 players
U.S. Cremonese players
F.C. Pavia players
U.S. Livorno 1915 players
F.C. Rieti players
Association football midfielders
People from Urbino
1989 births
Living people
Sportspeople from the Province of Pesaro and Urbino
Footballers from Marche